Moisés Benzaquén Rengifo Airport  is an airport serving Yurimaguas, a town on the Huallaga River in the Loreto Region of Peru. It is owned and operated by CORPAC S.A., a civil government agency. It was established in 1937.

The airport receives daily flights from Iquitos and Tarapoto operated by the Peruvian Air Force in an agreement with private operator SkyWay.

Airlines and destinations

See also
Transport in Peru
List of airports in Peru

References

External links
 
 OpenStreetMap - Yurimaguas

Airports in Peru
Buildings and structures in Loreto Region
1937 establishments in Peru